Rockford Bay is an unincorporated census-designated place in Kootenai County, Idaho, United States. As of the 2010 census, its population was 184.

Demographics

References

Census-designated places in Kootenai County, Idaho
Census-designated places in Idaho